Dusicyon is an extinct genus of South American canids. The type species is Dusicyon australis, the Falkland Islands wolf. In 1914, Oldfield Thomas established this genus, in which he included the culpeo and other South American foxes. These other canids were removed to Lycalopex by Langguth in 1975. Dusicyon avus, widely distributed in the late Pleistocene from Uruguay through Buenos Aires Province to southernmost Chile, is the closest known relative of the Falkland Islands wolf; the two lineages split only about 16,000 years ago. It died out in the late Holocene, earlier estimates suggested about 2,980 years ago on the island of Tierra del Fuego and almost 1,700 years ago in the continent. More recent research confirms much later extinction dates, with the latest confirmed records in the Pampean Region being 700 BP (1232–1397 AD) and southernmost Patagonia at 400 years BP (1454–1626 AD).

There is still much debate about the classification of "Dusicyon" cultridens. It has been suggested that this species be placed in the genera Canis or Lycalopex. This debate makes D. cultridens poorly researched.

References

External links

(Lycalopex mentioned as Dusicyon) THE DANGEROUS WILD ANIMALS ACT 1976 (MODIFICATION) (NO.2) ORDER 2007. http://www.legislation.gov.uk/uksi/2007/2465/schedule/made accessed 26 March 2014.

 
Cerdocyonina
Foxes
Mammal genera
Carnivorans of South America
Holocene extinctions
Extinct mammals of South America
Mammals described in 1839
Taxa named by Charles Hamilton Smith